John Aldrich (by 1520 – 1582), of Norwich, Norfolk, was an English politician.

He was a Member of Parliament (MP) for Norwich 1555 and 1572 and mayor of the city in 1570–71.

He was the third surviving son of Thomas Aldrich, alderman and mercer of Norwich, by Elizabeth Wood of Fulbourne, Cambridgeshire. By 1540 he had married Elizabeth Sotherton, daughter of Nicholas Sotherton (d.1540), alderman and Mayor of Norwich. They had three sons and 2 daughters.

References

1582 deaths
Politicians from Norwich
Mayors of Norwich
English MPs 1555
English MPs 1572–1583
Year of birth uncertain